The For Unlawful Carnal Knowledge Tour (often abbreviated as the F.U.C.K. Tour or simply The Fuck Tour) was a concert tour by American rock band Van Halen in support of their studio album For Unlawful Carnal Knowledge. It was one of the band's longer tours, divided into 99 dates. It featured shows in Hawaii and Mexico, places Van Halen rarely played in their history. 

Sammy Hagar chose Alice in Chains to be the opening act after seeing the music video for their hit single "Man In The Box" on MTV.

At the two Fresno, California, shows, the band filmed and recorded material for the live double album Live: Right Here, Right Now and live VHS Van Halen: Right Here, Right Now – Live (later also released on laserdisc and DVD). Promotion for these live works was the foundation of the band's next tour.

This tour included the song "Jump" in the set list. This song from 1984 had been the band's only US Hot 100 number 1, but in his attempt to 'forget' the band's past, Sammy Hagar had refused to sing it when he joined the band in 1985. Now an established member of the line-up, he agreed to sing it more often. This tour also marked the first time that keyboards were not performed live on stage by Eddie Van Halen. Keyboard and piano parts were performed off stage by Night Ranger keyboardist Alan Fitzgerald.

The tour was managed by touring veteran Scotty Ross, who has also managed the tours of Poison, Dio, Saliva and Celtic Woman.

Setlist

August–December 1991
"Poundcake"
"Judgement Day"
"Spanked"
"Runaround"
"When It's Love"
"There's Only One Way to Rock" (Sammy Hagar song)
Bass Solo
Drum Solo
"A.F.U. (Naturally Wired)"
"Panama"
"Why Can't This Be Love"
"Finish What Ya Started"
"Eagles Fly" (Sammy Hagar song)
Guitar Solo
"Best of Both Worlds"
"I Can't Drive 55" (Sammy Hagar song)
"The Dream Is Over"
"Jump"
"You Really Got Me" (The Kinks cover)
"Top of the World"

January–May 1992
"Poundcake"
"Judgement Day"
"Runaround"
"When It's Love"
"There's Only One Way to Rock"
Bass Solo
"Pleasure Dome"
Drum Solo
"Panama"
"Right Now"
"Why Can't This Be Love"
"Finish What Ya Started"
"Give to Live"
Guitar Solo
"You Really Got Me"
"I Can't Drive 55"
"Best of Both Worlds"
"Top of The World"
"Jump"
"The Dream Is Over"

Tour dates

Box office score data

Personnel
 Eddie Van Halen – guitar, backing vocals
 Michael Anthony – bass, backing vocals, keyboards
 Alex Van Halen – drums
 Sammy Hagar – lead vocals, guitar

Additional musician
 Alan Fitzgerald – keyboards

References

Van Halen concert tours
1992 concert tours
1991 concert tours